The 2011 North American Soccer League season is the 44th season of second division soccer in the United States and the inaugural season of the newly created North American Soccer League.

Earlier in 2011, the league's likelihood of earning second tier sanctioning had been thrown into question when the U.S. Soccer Federation rejected the league in January due to its financial instability. The USSF gave provisional sanctioning at the annual general meeting in Las Vegas on February 12, 2011.

Competition format
The NASL debuted in 2011 with 8 teams playing a 28-game regular season schedule, with 14 home and 14 away games, playing each opponent four times. The NASL’s playoff format consisted of the top six teams, with the first two teams receiving a bye until the semifinal round and the remaining four teams playing in a single-game playoff to advance to the semifinals. The semifinals and the finals will each consist of a two-game home and home aggregate goal system.

Regular season

Standings

Results

Source: NASL results table

Playoffs

The 6 qualifying teams will be given seeds 1 through 6 with the top team in the standings receiving the number 1 seed.

The format of the Playoffs will consist of a Quarterfinal Round, Semifinal Round and a Final Round. The Quarterfinal Round will be a single game while the Semifinal and Final Rounds will each be a 2-game series with each team playing at home once and the team with the greater number of aggregate goals in both games winning each series.

The number 1 seed and the number 2 seed will receive a bye directly to the Semifinal Round while the number 3 seed will host the number 6 seed and the number 4 seed will host the number 5 seed in the Quarterfinal Round.

For the Semifinal Round, the number 1 seed will be paired with the lowest seeded team to qualify from the Quarterfinal Round with the number 2 seed being paired with the highest seeded team to qualify from the Quarterfinal Round.

The winners of each series in the Semifinal Round will meet in the Final Round known as the Soccer Bowl. In the event of a draw in either Quarterfinal Round game, such game will progress to a 30-minute extra time period (the golden goal rule will not be in effect). If the teams are still locked in a draw following the extra time period, the winner will be determined by a penalty shootout.

In each Semifinal Round series and the Final Round series, if the teams are tied on the number of aggregate goals scored in the series at the conclusion of the second game, the teams will progress to a 30-minute extra time period. As in the Quarterfinal Round, the golden goal rule will not be in effect. If the teams are still locked in a draw following the extra time period, the winner of the series will be determined by a penalty shootout.

Bracket

Quarterfinals

Semifinals

Tied 4–4 on aggregate. NSC Minnesota Stars win 5–3 on penalties.

Fort Lauderdale Strikers win 5–2 on aggregate.

Soccer Bowl 2011

NSC Minnesota Stars win Soccer Bowl 2011, 3–1 on aggregate.

Attendance

Statistical leaders

Top scorers

Source:

Top assists

Source:

|}

Top goalkeepers
(Minimum of 1260 Minutes Played)

Source:

Awards

League awards
 Golden Ball (MVP):  Etienne Barbara (Carolina RailHawks) 
Golden Boot: Etienne Barbara (Carolina RailHawks) 
 Golden Glove: Evan Bush (Montreal Impact) 
 Coach of the Year: Manny Lagos (NSC Minnesota Stars) 
 Fair Play Award: FC Tampa Bay

References

External links
 Official website

 
North American Soccer League seasons
NASL